MicroVision, Inc. is an American company that develops laser scanning technology for projection, remote sensing, image capture, and lidar. MicroVision's display technology uses a micro-electrical mechanical systems (MEMS) scanning mirror with red, green, blue, and infrared lasers, optics and electronics to project and/or capture images. The company sells and licenses its products primarily to original equipment manufacturers (OEMs).

The MEMS scanning micro-mirror is the basis of MicroVision’s technology platform. The MEMS design consists of a silicon device with a millimeter-scale mirror at the center. The mirror is connected to flexures that allow it to swing vertically and horizontally to display (or capture) an image. In projection-mode the MEMS laser beam scanning display method can be compared to raster scanning in a cathode ray tube (CRT) display.
Product applications include mobile projection (e.g. customers: Sony, Sharp Robohon), automotive head-up display/head-up displays (HUD) (customer: Pioneer CyberNavi), virtual retinal display, head-mounted display and augmented reality displays used e.g. in Microsoft HoloLens 2, and short, mid, and long range lidar in one unit. The technology has also been used in a smartphone by the manufacturer Blackview.

In May 2018, Microvision entered into a license agreement with a global technology company to use company's display technology to manufacture and sell display-only engines. With their first quarter 2020 financial results, MicroVision announced the potential sale of the company. In April 2021, the company's stock price surged after being discussed on the subreddit WallStreetBets, and was up more than 7,600% over the past year.

In January 2023 Microvision completed the acquisition of assets of German lidar hard- and software company Ibeo Automotive Systems GmbH including 250 employees.

References

External links
Official website

Companies based in Redmond, Washington
Information technology companies of the United States